Bogatye Saby (Baylar Sabası) is an urban locality (an urban-type settlement) and the administrative center of Sabinsky District in the Republic of Tatarstan, Russia, located on the Saby River (Myosha's basin),  from the republic's capital of Kazan. As of the 2010 Census, its population was 7,671.

History
It was established during the Khanate of Kazan period. Bogatye Saby served as the district administrative center since 1930. Urban-type settlement status was granted to it in 2004.

Administrative and municipal status
Within the framework of administrative divisions, the urban-type settlement of Bogatye Saby serves as the administrative center of Sabinsky District, of which it is a part. As a municipal division, Bogatye Saby, together with one rural locality (the village of Sredniye Saby), is incorporated within Sabinsky Municipal District as Bogatye Saby Urban Settlement.

Economy
As of 1997, industrial enterprises in Bogatye Saby included a variety of companies serving agricultural needs.

Demographics

As of 1992, the majority of the population is Tatar.

References

Notes

Sources

Urban-type settlements in the Republic of Tatarstan
Mamadyshsky Uyezd